Guillem Morales (born September 1973) is a Spanish film and television director from Barcelona.

Filmography
 Back Room (1999)
The Uninvited Guest (Spanish: El Habitante Incierto) (2004),  for which Morales was nominated for the Goya Award for Best New Director at the 20th Goya Awards
Julia's Eyes (Spanish: Ojos de Julia) (2010). As well as directing the film, Morales co-wrote the screenplay.

Television
 Decline and Fall (2017), based on the first novel by Evelyn Waugh, filmed at Winchester University, and starring comic Jack Whitehall
The Miniaturist (TV series) (2017)
Inside No. 9, episodes "La Couchette" (2015), "The 12 Days of Christine" (2015), "The Bill" (2017), "The Riddle of the Sphinx " (2017), "Empty Orchestra" (2017),  "Diddle Diddle Dumpling" (2017), "Love's Great Adventure" (2020), "Misdirection" (2020), "The Stakeout" (2020), "Wuthering Heist" (2021), "Simon Says" (2021), "Lip Service" (2021) and "How Do You Plead?" (2021).

References

External links

1973 births
Living people
People from Barcelona
Spanish film directors
Spanish television directors